Pimm Fox is the news anchor of Taking Stock, a program of business interviews and financial news analysis broadcast daily on Bloomberg Radio.  The program was previously also broadcast on Bloomberg Television.  He discusses industry and market trends with guests and financial experts.

Personal life
Fox was born in Brooklyn, NY in 1960.  He attended New York City public schools and graduated high school from  Collegiate School (New York). He earned his bachelor's degree at Columbia College, Columbia University. He served in the US Navy.

Host shows
 Taking Stock (since 2006)

References

External links
 Taking Stock podcasts on Bloomberg.com

Living people
American reporters and correspondents
1960 births
American business and financial journalists
Writers from New York (state)
Columbia College (New York) alumni
Bloomberg L.P. people
American television news anchors
American male journalists